This is a list of Portuguese football transfers for the 2022–23 winter transfer window. The winter transfer window will open 1 January 2023, although a few transfers may take place prior to that date. The window closes at midnight on 1 February 2023 although outgoing transfers might still happen to leagues in which the window is still open. Only moves involving Primeira Liga clubs are listed. Additionally, players without a club may join a club at any time.

Transfers

References

Lists of Portuguese football transfers
Football transfers winter 2022–23
2022–23 in Portuguese football